The Jharkhand Swarna Jayanti Express is a Superfast train belonging to South Eastern Railway zone that runs between  and  in India. It is currently being operated with 12873/12874 train numbers on tri-weekly basis.

Service

 12873/Jharkhand Swarna Jayanti SF Express has an average speed of 55 km/hr and covers 1328 km in 24h 15m.
 12874/Jharkhand Swarna Jayanti SF Express has an average speed of 55 km/hr and covers 27h 30m km in 24h 10m.

Route and halts 

The halts of the train are:

Coach composition

The train has standard LHB coach with max speed of 160 kmph. The train consists of 23 coaches:

 1 AC II Tier
 3 AC III Tier
 13 Sleeper coaches
 1 Pantry car
 3 General Unreserved
 2 Seating cum Luggage Rake

Traction

These trains are hauled by a Tatanagar-based WAP-7 from Hatia to Chopan. From Chopan train is hauled by Patratu-based twin WDM-3A diesel locomotive to Chunar. From Chunar, train is hauled by Ghaziabad Loco Shed-based WAP-4, and vice versa.

Rake sharing

The train shares its rake with 12817/12818 Jharkhand Swarna Jayanti Express, 12811/12812 Lokmanya Tilak Terminus–Hatia Superfast Express and 12835/12836 Hatia–Yesvantpur Superfast Express.

See also 

 Lokmanya Tilak Terminus railway station
 Hatia railway station
 Jharkhand Swarna Jayanti Express
 Lokmanya Tilak Terminus–Hatia Superfast Express
 Hatia–Yesvantpur Superfast Express

Notes

References

External links 

 12873/Jharkhand Swarna Jayanti SF Express India Rail Info
 12874/Jharkhand Swarna Jayanti SF Express India Rail Info

Transport in Ranchi
Transport in Delhi
Swarna Jayanti Express trains
Rail transport in Maharashtra
Rail transport in Uttar Pradesh
Rail transport in Delhi